The Great Eastern Steeplechase was an Australian Thoroughbred steeplechase horse race held annually at Oakbank, South Australia on Easter Saturday and Monday at the Oakbank Racecourse as part of the Oakbank Easter Racing Carnival. The first fixture of that name was held in 1877, following a race in 1876 which has been called the "Onkaparinga Handicap Steeplechase"; both just prior to formation of the Onkaparinga Racing Club (now Oakbank Racing Club).

The distance of the race is 4950 metres making it the second longest horse race held on a public course in Australia.

The most famous jump is the fallen log which is literally a log about a metre high. All other jumps are brush fences. The height of jumps has been reduced in recent years to reduce the risk of falls and make for safer racing.

The race uses a different course to other races held at Oakbank with horse using an inner track passing on the inside of a hill. Unlike other races that require two race callers the Great Eastern can be viewed in its entirety from the grandstand.

On October 1st 2021 it was announced that jumps racing will no longer be conducted in South Australia mainly due to the small number of South Australian jumps horses. There were plans to run the Great Eastern and Von Doussa Steeplechase as a flat race. However on 3rd March 2022 it was announced that would not happen. However, many jumps racing supporters attempted to keep jumps racing at Oakbank and that fight went into the South Australian Court System. That would result in an election occurring which the anti-jumps faction won but debate surrounding that vote spilled into more legal action. But not long after the South Australian Government stepped in and outlawed jumps racing in the state.

Past winners

References

 Oakbank Racing Club
 Heroes and Warriors – The Great Eastern Steeplechase

Horse races in Australia
Steeplechase (horse racing)